Grant Evans may refer to:

Grant Evans (scholar)
Grant Evans (footballer)